The following is a list of Sites of Special Scientific Interest in the Clydesdale and South East Glasgow Area of Search.  For other areas, see List of SSSIs by Area of Search.

 Avondale
 Birk Knowes
 Birkenhead Burn
 Black Loch Moss
 Blantyre Muir
 Bothwell Castle Grounds
 Braehead Moss
 Calder Glen
 Cander Moss
 Carnwath Moss
 Carstairs Kames
 Cart and Kittoch Valleys
 Cartland Craigs
 Cleghorn Glen
 Coalburn Moss
 Cobbinshaw Moss
 Cobbinshaw Reservoir
 Craigengar
 Craighead Hill Quarry
 Cranley Moss
 Dolphinton - West Linton Fens and Grassland
 Dunside
 Falls of Clyde
 Fiddlers Gill
 Garrion Gill
 Gillsburn and Mare Gill
 Hamilton High Parks
 Hamilton Low Parks
 Hassockrigg and North Shotts Mosses
 Jock's Gill Wood
 Kennox Water
 Lady Bells Moss
 Leadhills-Wanlockhead
 Longriggend Moss
 Millburn
 Millers Wood
 Milton Lockhart Wood
 Muirkirk Uplands
 Nethan Gorge
 North Bellstane Plantation
 North Lowther Uplands
 Raven Gill
 Red Moss
 Ree Burn and Glenbuck Loch
 River Clyde Meanders
 Shiel Burn
 Shiel Dod
 Slamannan Plateau
 Tinto Hills
 Townhead Burn
 Upper Nethan Valley Woods
 Waukenwae Moss
 Woodend Loch

 
Clydesdale and South East Glasgow